Moisei  Abramovich Itkis (20 April 1929 – 22 June 2009) was a Soviet sports shooter. He competed in the 300 metre rifle, three positions event at the 1960 Summer Olympics.

19-time record holder world and Europe. 75-time record holder of the USSR.  He was awarded the Order of the Badge of Honour.

Graduated from  Lesgaft National State University of Physical Education, Sport and Health. He taught at the Mozhaysky St. Petersburg Military Engineering Institute.

References

1929 births
2009 deaths
Soviet male sport shooters
Soviet colonels
Olympic shooters of the Soviet Union
Shooters at the 1960 Summer Olympics
Sportspeople from Kropyvnytskyi
Lesgaft National State University of Physical Education, Sport and Health alumni
Honoured Masters of Sport of the USSR